The Businessman may refer to:

 The Businessman (novel), a 1984 novel by Thomas M. Disch
 "The Business Man" (short story), an 1840 short story by Edgar Allan Poe
 An alternate name for the 1935 diesel-electric streamliner Flying Yankee

See also
 Businessman (disambiguation)